John Thaddeus Ostrowski (October 17, 1917 – November 13, 1992) was an American professional baseball player. Born in Chicago, he was an outfielder and third baseman who spent all or part of seven Major League seasons (1943–1946; 1948–1950) with the Chicago Cubs, Boston Red Sox, Chicago White Sox and Washington Senators.

Over his 216 MLB games played, Ostrowski was a .234 hitter (131-for-561) with 14 home runs and 74 RBI in 216 games, including 73 runs, 20 doubles, nine triples, seven stolen bases, and a .321 on-base percentage. However, in a 1,600-game minor league baseball career, Ostrowski hit 218 home runs and five times exceeded the 20-homer mark, including two 30 home run seasons.

Ostrowski died in Chicago at the age of 75.

External links

Retrosheet

1917 births
1992 deaths
Baseball players from Chicago
Boston Red Sox players
Chicago Cubs players
Chicago White Sox players
Jackson Senators players
Kansas City Blues (baseball) players
Los Angeles Angels (minor league) players
Macon Peaches players
Major League Baseball outfielders
Major League Baseball third basemen
Memphis Chickasaws players
Oakland Oaks (baseball) players
Sacramento Solons players
Superior Blues players
Toronto Maple Leafs (International League) players
Troy Trojans (minor league) players
Washington Senators (1901–1960) players